The 6th APAN Star Awards ceremony was held on October 13, 2018 at Kyunghee University Peace Hall, Seoul, hosted by Kim Seung-woo. First held in 2012, the annual awards ceremony recognizes the excellence in South Korea's television. Nominees were selected from 93 Korean dramas that aired on broadcasting networks MBC, KBS and SBS and cable channels tvN, jtbc, OCN, MBN and TV Chosun, from September 2, 2017 to September 2, 2018. 

The highest honor of the ceremony, Grand Prize (Daesang), was awarded to the actor Lee Byung-hun of the drama series Mr. Sunshine.

Nominations and winners

Winners are listed first, highlighted in boldface, and indicated with a dagger.

References

External links
 

APAN
APAN Star Awards
APAN Star Awards